Carbon Engineering Ltd. is a Canadian-based clean energy company focusing on the commercialization of Direct Air Capture (DAC) technology that captures carbon dioxide (CO2) directly from the atmosphere.

This captured  can either be stored underground, or converted into carbon-neutral fuel using renewable energy sources, by a process the company calls Air to fuels. 
The company is running a pilot plant in Squamish, British Columbia, removing CO2 from the atmosphere since 2015 and converting it into fuels since December, 2017.

The company was founded in 2009 by David Keith, now a board member as well as a professor of public policy and applied physics at Harvard University, and is now led by Daniel Friedmann as CEO, who served as the former CEO of Canadian aero-space company, MDA, for 20 years.

Carbon Engineering is funded by several government and sustainability-focused agencies as well as by private investors, including Microsoft founder Bill Gates and oil sands financier N. Murray Edwards. 
In addition, in 2019 the company received US$68 million from private investors, including fossil fuel companies Chevron Corporation, Occidental Petroleum, and BHP.

Technology 
Carbon Engineering's DAC system integrates two main cycles. The first cycle is the absorption of CO2 from the atmosphere in a device called an "air contactor" using an alkaline hydroxide solution, via proprietary patents such as US20140271379A1 and US20150329369A1. The second cycle regenerates the capture liquid used in the air contactor, and delivers pure CO2 as an end product. 
These cycles operate in tandem continuously, producing a concentrated stream of CO2 gas as an output, and requiring only energy, water, and small material make up streams as inputs. Energy is used in such a way that no new CO2 emissions are incurred, and thus do not counteract what was captured from the air. The captured atmospheric CO2 can be stored underground, used for enhanced oil recovery, or turned into low-carbon synthetic fuels using the company's "air to fuel" technology.

Carbon Engineering's Air to fuel process can produce fuels such as gasoline, diesel, or jet A using inputs of atmospheric CO2, water, and renewable electricity such as that from solar PV. Electricity is used to split water (by electrolysis) and manufacture hydrogen, which is then combined with captured atmospheric CO2 to form fuels. This approach offers a means to deliver clean fuels that are compatible with existing engines, and can help de-carbonize the transportation sector by displacing fuels made from crude oil.

Pilot plant demonstration
In 2015, Carbon Engineering started operations of its full end-to-end pilot plant, located in Squamish, British Columbia, Canada. When running, this facility captures roughly 1 ton of atmospheric CO2 per day. 
In 2017, the company incorporated fuel synthesis capability into the DAC pilot plant and converted CO2 into fuel for the first time in December 2017.

Based on the data obtained from the pilot plant, Keith and colleagues published an article in 2018 that presents a simulation suggesting that CO2 can be captured from the atmosphere at a cost of between US$94 to US$233 per ton, "depending on financial assumptions, energy costs, and the specific choice of inputs and outputs."

Both DAC and Air to fuel technologies have been proven at the pilot plant and are now being scaled up into commercial markets. Individual DAC facilities can be built to capture 1 million tons of CO2 per year. At that scale, one Carbon Engineering air capture plant could negate the emissions from ~250,000 cars—either by sequestering the CO2 or by using the recycled carbon dioxide as a feedstock to produce synthetic fuel.

Commercialization 
In May 2019, Carbon Engineering announced it was partnering with Oxy Low Carbon Ventures, LLC. (OLCV), a subsidiary of Occidental Petroleum, to design and engineer a large-scale DAC plant capable of capturing 500,000 metric tons of carbon dioxide from the air each year, which would be used in OLCV's enhanced oil recovery operations and subsequently stored underground permanently. Located in the Permian Basin, construction for the plant is expected to begin in 2022, with operations targeted for 2024. In September 2019, Carbon Engineering announced they were expanding the capacity of the design of the plant from 500,000 metric tons to an expected one million metric tons of CO2 captured per year.

References

External links

"How One Company Pulls Carbon From The Air, Aiming To Avert A Climate Catastrophe" December 10, 2018 NPR.org
 Katie Brigham: Bill Gates and Big Oil back this company that’s trying to solve climate change by sucking CO2 out of the air, CNBC, 22 June 2019

Privately held companies of Canada
2009 establishments in British Columbia
Energy companies established in 2009
Direct air capture